Bagatipara is an upazila of Natore District in the Division of Rajshahi, Bangladesh.

Geography
It has an area of 139.37 km2 and is bounded by Natore Sadar Upazila on the north, Lalpur Upazila on the south, Baraigram Upazila on the east and Charghat, Bagha and Puthia Upazilas on the west. The soil of the upazila is mainly plain; there are few depressions. The main river is Boral.

Demographics

According to the 2011 Bangladesh census, Bagatipara Upazila had 33,383 households and a population of 131,002, 7.6% of whom lived in urban areas. 8.5% of the population was under the age of 5. The literacy rate (age 7 and over) was 56.5%, compared to the national average of 51.8%.

Administration
Bagatipara Thana was formed in 1906 and it was turned into an upazila on 15 April 1983.

The Upazila is divided into Bagatipara Municipality and five union parishads: Bagatipara, Dayarampur, Faguardiar, Jamnagor, and Panka. The union parishads are subdivided into 93 mauzas and 134 villages.

Bagatipara Municipality is subdivided into 9 wards and 17 mahallas.

See also
Upazilas of Bangladesh
Districts of Bangladesh
Divisions of Bangladesh

References

Upazilas of Natore District